Thellungiella is a genus of plants in the family Brassicaceae closely related to Arabidopsis, but in the subclade Eutremeae. In recent classifications, the genus is no longer recognized, and the formerly included species are now placed in the genus Eutrema or  Schrenkiella.

They are commonly known as saltwater cresses because of their ability to grow in salty environments. As well as salinity, Thellungiella has an exceptionally high resistance to cold, drought, and oxidative stresses.  As a result, it has become an extremophile model for abiotic stress tolerance studies and two Thellungiella genomes have been sequenced. See the list of sequenced plant genomes.  Thellungiella is an excellent model organism for several other reasons: it has a relatively small genome size (approximately twice that of A. thaliana), a rapid life cycle, small size, high seed production, and ecotypes available that show a range of stress responses.

The genus includes the following species:

Thellungiella botschantzevii
Thellungiella parvula
Thellungiella pumila
Thellungiella runcinata
Thellungiella salsuginea
Thellungiella toxophylla

References

External links 
 Thellungiella genome webpage
 Hua-Jun Wu, Zhonghui Zhang, Jun-Yi Wang, Dong-Ha Oh, Maheshi Dassanayake, Binghang Liu, Quanfei Huang, Hai-Xi Sun, Ran Xia, Yaorong Wu, Yi-Nan Wang, Zhao Yang, Yang Liu, Wanke Zhang, Huawei Zhang, Jinfang Chu, Cunyu Yan, Shuang Fang, Jinsong Zhang, Yiqin Wang, Fengxia Zhang, Guodong Wang, Sang Yeol Lee, John M. Cheeseman, Bicheng Yang, Bo Li, Jiumeng Min, Linfeng Yang, Jun Wang, Chengcai Chu, Shou-Yi Chen, Hans J. Bohnert, Jian-Kang Zhu, Xiu-Jie Wang, and Qi Xie (2012) Insights into salt tolerance from the genome of Thellungiella salsuginea. PNAS 109 (30) 12219-12224

Brassicaceae
Brassicaceae genera
Historically recognized angiosperm genera